Riquimbili are improvised motor-powered bicycles found in Cuba, often using such things as a chainsaw motor and a plastic bottle to hold the gasoline. These improvised motorcycles are illegal but tolerated. Some riquimbili are modified for racing, which is less tolerated by authorities.

References

Vehicles of Cuba
Custom motorcycles
Motorized bicycles